Arundel and South Downs is a constituency in West Sussex created in 1997 and represented in the House of Commons of the UK Parliament since 2019 by Andrew Griffith of the Conservative Party.

Constituency profile
This is a mostly rural constituency including the town of Arundel and villages within the South Downs national park boundaries or encircled by the park; the largest of which are Hassocks, Hurstpierpoint, Petworth, Pulborough, Steyning and Storrington. Residents' incomes and house prices are significantly wealthier than the UK averages.

Boundaries

2010 – reviewed boundaries adopted
Following their review of parliamentary boundaries in West Sussex which Parliament approved in 2007, the Boundary Commission for England formed new constituencies.  First contested in 2010 the seat was constituted as follows:

In their recommendations, the Boundary Commission for England mooted the name Chanctonbury after uninhabited Chanctonbury Ring, an ancient hill fort at its centre. This name was rejected during the local inquiry process at which the current name was chosen.

History

Results and EU referendum stance
The 2017 result saw the sixth Conservative win.

Second-place runners-up have been, listed in order, four times a Liberal Democrat, once the UKIP candidate and once the Labour candidate.  In line with regional trends, the highest percentage of the vote among these was the Liberal Democrat in 2010, with 27.9% of the vote.

In June 2016, an estimated 50.3% of local adults voting in the EU membership referendum chose to remain in the European Union instead of to leave. This was defied in two January 2018 votes in Parliament by its MP, in line with his governing party's promise to adhere to the overall result of that referendum.

The 2015-2017 status was as the 8th safest of the Conservative Party's 331 seats by percentage of majority.

De-selection of incumbent seeking re-election in 2005
The incumbent Howard Flight MP had national media coverage in the run-up to the 2005 general election due to his deselection requested by the party leader for membership of Conservative Way Forward, lobbying for spending cuts to be more severe than set out in the small cuts in the 2005 manifesto. Flight hinted his preferred cuts would be as implemented by a Conservative government in his view.  He had represented the constituency since its creation at the 1997 general election. Anne Marie Morris, Laura Sandys and Nick Herbert put themselves forward for nomination as replacement candidates.  The chosen candidate, Nick Herbert, won the seat at the election. Morris and Sandys became MPs elsewhere in 2010.

Predecessor seats
The seat and its predecessors have in the 20th century been a Conservative Party stronghold save that the minor contributory Horsham seat to the area's electorate saw victory by 8.6% of the vote over the Labour Party in 1966, followed statistically by a next-most-marginal victory again with the Labour Party as runner-up, in 1950, of 14.4%.

Between 1974 and 1983, much of the South Downs area was part of the Shoreham constituency, with the town of Arundel remaining in the Arundel constituency.

Prior to 1974, the seat was largely part of the Arundel and Shoreham constituency.

Members of Parliament

Elections

Elections in the 2010s

Elections in the 2000s

Elections in the 1990s

See also
List of parliamentary constituencies in West Sussex

Notes

References

Sources
Election result, 2005 (BBC)
Election results, 1997 – 2001 (BBC)
Election results, 1997 – 2001  (Election Demon)
Election results, 1997 – 2005 (Guardian)

Parliamentary constituencies in South East England
Constituencies of the Parliament of the United Kingdom established in 1997
Politics of West Sussex
Arun District
Chichester District
Mid Sussex District
Horsham District
Arundel